Pavilion of Women is a 2001 Chinese-American drama film directed by Yim Ho and written by Luo Yan and Paul Collins. The film stars Willem Dafoe, Luo Yan, Sau Sek, John Cho, Yi Ding and Koh Chieng Mun. The film was released on April 20, 2001 in China and on May 4, 2001 in the United States by Universal Focus. It was Universal's first co-production with a Chinese studio.

Plot

Cast
Willem Dafoe as Father Andre
Luo Yan as Madame Wu Ailian
Sau Sek as Mr. Wu
John Cho as Fengmo Wu
Yi Ding as Chiuming
Koh Chieng Mun as Ying
Anita Loo as Old Lady Wu
Amy Hill as Madame Kang
Kate McGregor-Stewart as Sister Shirley
Jia Dong Liu as Mr. Lang
Shu Chen as Head Servant
Hang-Sang Poon as Fat Cook
Li Wang as Kang Lin Yi
You Jin Xu as Matchmaker
Ding Yuan Gu as Mayor
Pei Ying Zhao as Midwife
Xiao Dong Mao as Liangmo
Lan Huang as Meng

Production
The movie is based on the 1946 novel Pavilion of Women: A Novel of Life in the Women's Quarters, by Nobel-prize winning novelist Pearl S. Buck.

Reception

Critical reception
Pavilion of Women was met with negative reviews. On Rotten Tomatoes the film has a rating of 6% based on reviews from 31 critics, with an average score of 3.1/10. The site's consensus is: "Generating more suds than a soap opera, this adaptation of Pearl Buck's novel sinks under the weight of excess melodrama, stilted performances, and cheesy dialogue." On Metacritic, which assigns a normalized rating out of 100 top reviews from mainstream critics, calculated a score of 26 out of 100 based on 14 reviews, indicating "generally unfavorable reviews".

Box office
The film officially grossed 6 million yuan ($720,000) in its first 17 days from 240 screens in 10 Chinese cities. Luo Yan, the producer and co-star, accused Forbidden City, the Beijing distributor, of reallocating the film's receipts against their own film, Purple Day. The film grossed $36,992 in the United States and Canada.

References

External links
 

2001 films
American drama films
2001 drama films
Films directed by Yim Ho
2000s English-language films
2000s American films